Richard Johnson (27 October 1937 – 4 August 2019) was an Irish judge who served as President of the High Court from 2006 to 2009 and a Judge of the High Court from 1987 to 2009.

He was also under the terms of the Constitution of Ireland by virtue of that office an ex-officio member of the Supreme Court. In the absence of the Chief Justice, he acted as a member of the Presidential Commission.

Johnson was born in Blennerville, County Kerry, and studied law at University College Dublin (UCD). He qualified as a barrister at the King's Inns in 1960. He practised on the South Western Circuit (Kerry, Limerick and Clare) until he became Senior Counsel in 1977. As a Senior Counsel he practised on the Munster Circuit and in Dublin until 1987. He was appointed to the High Court in 1987. His father was a district court judge for a number of years and his son and daughter are barristers. The Government nominated Justice Nicholas Kearns on 7 October 2009 to replace him as President of the High Court.

After his retirement as president and a judge, he gave an interview to the media in which he suggested the legislature should revisit the issue of whether the death penalty should be allowed as punishment for particularly serious crimes, such as murder committed in the course of armed robbery. Mayor of Limerick Kevin Kiely supported the proposal as a response to the continuing increase in murders in Ireland.

References

External links 
High Court of Ireland

Living people
1937 births
People from Tralee
Alumni of University College Dublin
Presidents of the High Court (Ireland)
20th-century Irish lawyers
Alumni of King's Inns